Yama Wolasmal (born 1982) is an Afghan-born Norwegian news anchor.

He was born in Kabul. His family fled to Pakistan when he was three months old, and emigrated to Norway as refugees as few years later. He grew up in the Grünerløkka and Bjørndal neighborhoods of Oslo.

Wolasmal had journalistic assignments in Dagbladet and TV 2, and was also a correspondent in Afghanistan. When employed by TV 2 he became moderator of the debate show Underhuset. In November 2017 he was hired as anchor of Norway's main television news program, Dagsrevyen.

References

1982 births
Living people
Afghan expatriates in Pakistan
Afghan emigrants to Norway
Television people from Oslo
Norwegian television presenters
Norwegian television news anchors
TV 2 (Norway) people
NRK people